Premier League Productions is an IMG produced company with studio shows and commentators for worldwide viewers of Premier League association football.

English-language broadcast team
The company has a group of UK based commentators, pundits, and presenters. Formerly, John Dykes led the presentation team between 2010 and 2017. Currently Steve Bower,  Manish Bhasin and Seema Jaswal present Matchday Live on weekends with other presenters such as Jules Breach (on Fridays), Ian Irving and Will Perry filling in as needed. Kelly Cates and Mark Pougatch (among others) contribute as presenters for studio shows. Different guest pundits appear on each programme including Glenn Hoddle, Michael Owen, Alan Shearer, Ian Wright, Steve McManaman and Tim Sherwood.

Studio show presenters (2022-2023 season):

Fanzone (Friday edition) - Fridays 1530 LIVE (London Time - UTC+1 from last Sunday in March through Saturday before last Sunday in October, UTC otherwise)

Will Perry
Clinton Morrison

Fanzone (Monday edition) - Mondays 2100 LIVE (on days without matches kicking off at 2000 ONLY)

Anita Nneka Jones
Leroy Rosenior

Generation xG - Mondays 1700 

Matt Holland
Leroy Rosenior  (co-presenter)
Leon Osman   (backup)

Kelly and Wrighty - Mondays 1400

Kelly Cates 
Ian Wright

Team Talks - Fridays 1800 on non-match days, LIVE at 2230 on match days

 Jules Breach
 Will Perry  (backup)

The Big Interview - Thursdays 1330 (pre-recorded)

 Steve Bower  (lead)
 Alex Aljoe  (when interviews are conducted in French, Italian, Portuguese or Spanish with English subtitles)

The Final Word - Mondays 2230 LIVE (on match days with kickoff time of 2000 ONLY)

 Steve Bower
 Michael Owen  (lead studio pundit)

The Weekend Wrap - Sundays 2100

 Mark Pougatch

Welcome to the Weekend - Fridays 1100 (on match weekends ONLY)

 Johnathan Joseph
 Olivia Buzaglo
 Andrew Mensah
 Ayo Akinwolere (reporter and backup presenter)

Main Commentators (play-by-play):
  Jim Proudfoot (lead) 
  Conor McNamara (lead) 
  Joe Speight (Goal Rush broadcast on Saturdays 1500)
  Ian Darke
  Martin Tyler
  Gary Taphouse
  Tony Jones
  Nigel Adderley
  Mark Scott
  Jonathan Beck
  Chris Wise
  Phil Blacker
  Steve Wilson
  Daniel Mann
  Jon Champion
  Richard Kaufman
  Kevin Keatings
  Seb Hutchinson
  David Stowell
  Andy Bishop
  Guy Havord
  Rob Palmer
  Bill Leslie
  Alan Parry
  Gary Weaver
  Rob Hawthorne
  Ian Crocker
  Steve Banyard
  Stewart Gardner
  Paul Gilmour
  Jacqui Oatley
  Pien Meulensteen
  Clive Tyldesley
  Jon Driscoll
  Tom Gayle
  John Roder
  Robyn Cowen
  Guy Mowbray
  Paul Dempsey
  Vicki Sparks
  Martin Fisher
  Steven Wyeth
  Sam Matterface
  Rory Hamilton
  Paul Walker
  Ben Andrews
  Dan Roebuck
  James Fielden
  Jonathan Pearce
  Simon Brotherton
  Alistair Mann
  Dan Mason
  Wayne Boyce
  Simon Watts
  Dave Farrar
  Rob MacLean
  Adam Summerton
  Adrian Healey
  Derek Rae
  Rob Daly
  Peter Drury  (On loan from NBC Sports for occasional matches through May 2028)
  Dominic Johnson

Co-commentators (match analysts):
  Jim Beglin (lead)
  Andy Townsend (lead)
  Leon Osman
  Matt Holland
  Don Hutchison  (Goal Rush broadcast on Saturdays 1500)
  David Prutton
  Clive Allen
  Efan Ekoku
  Chris Sutton
  Matthew Upson
  Steve Sidwell
  Robert Green
  Tony Gale
  Alan Smith
  Gary Neville
  Stephen Warnock
  Terry Gibson
  Lee Hendrie
  Iain Dowie
  Dean Ashton
  Chris Waddle
  Keith Andrews
  Danny Higginbotham
  Garry Birtles
  Don Goodman
  Andy Hinchcliffe
  Kevin Kilbane
  Andy Walker
  David Phillips
  Danny Gabbidon
  Dave Edwards
  Davie Provan
  Leroy Rosenior
  Karen Carney
  Courtney Sweetman-Kirk
  Michael Bridges
  Paul Robinson
  Alan Hutton
  Glenn Murray
  Casey Stoney
  Lucy Ward
  Sue Smith
  Mark Schwarzer
  Michael Brown
  Ally McCoist
  Gary Breen
  Michael Gray
  Matt Jackson
  Neil Warnock
  Sam Parkin
  Adam Virgo
  Tony Dorigo
  Ray Houghton
  Stewart Robson
  Laura Bassett
  Nigel Spackman
  Dean Sturridge
  Nigel Winterburn
  Trevor Francis
  Alan Curbishley
  Barry Horne
  Mark Bright
  James McFadden

Spanish-language broadcast team

Beginning with the 2022-23 season, Premier League Productions, in conjunction with production partner Telemundo Deportes, will employ Spanish-language señal internacional ("world feed") match commentators, most of whom will work "off tube" (off monitor) from Telemundo Center in Miami, Florida, USA or from Telemundo's Mexico City, Mexico bureau.  Their voices will be heard each week via streaming video services Paramount+ and Pluto TV in Mexico and Central America, and occasionally via streaming video service Star+ in 9 Spanish-speaking countries in South America.  YouTube users in the USA can also listen to their voices in highlights clips at the "Telemundo Deportes" account.

Narradores/Relatores (main commentators/"play-by-play"):

 Jesús Eduardo Acosta (Miami, Florida, USA)
 Copán Álvarez (Miami, Florida, USA)
 Juan Guillermo Arango (Miami, Florida, USA)
 José Bauz (Miami, Florida, USA)
 Jorge D. Calvo (Miami, Florida, USA)
 Óscar Guzmán (Mexico City, Mexico)
 Iván López Elizondo (Mexico City, Mexico)
 Alfredo "Lobo" Morales (Mexico City, Mexico)
 Diego Pessolano (Miami, Florida, USA)
 Óscar F. Salazar (Miami, Florida, USA)

Analistas (match analysts/co-commentators):

 Kaziro Aoyama (Mexico City, Mexico)
 Juan Guillermo Arango (Miami, Florida, USA)
 José Bauz (Miami, Florida, USA)
 Alberto Bernard (Mexico City, Mexico)
 Luis Gerardo Bucci (Miami, Florida, USA)
 Fernando Cevallos (Mexico City, Mexico)
 Daniel Chapela (Miami, Florida, USA)
 Carlos Hermosillo (Miami, Florida, USA)
 Jaime Fernando Macías (Miami, Florida, USA)
 Walter Reinaldo Roque (Miami, Florida, USA)
 Omar Salazar (Miami, Florida, USA)

References

Premier League